Mis Ídolos, Hoy Mis Amigos!!! is the ninth studio album by Mexican group Julión Álvarez y su Norteño Banda, released on April 8, 2016, by Fonovisa Records. The album was produced by Álvarez and features a mixture of banda and norteño music. The first three tracks are originals sung as duets with El Coyote ("El Guitarrero"), Pancho Barraza ("Hay Amores"), and Julio Preciado ("Cariñito Cariñito"). The other seventeen tracks are covers of El Coyote's, Barraza's, and Preciado's songs.

Mis Ídolos, Hoy Mis Amigos!!! reached number one on the Billboard Top Latin Albums chart in the United States.
The album was nominated for Best Banda Album at the 17th Annual Latin Grammy Awards in 2016.

Promotion 
To promote the album, Álvarez launched a 22-City Arena tour, touring throughout the United States. It started on July 15 in San Jose, California.

Commercial reception 
In the United States, it peaked at number one on the Billboard Top Latin Albums and the Billboard Regional Mexican Albums charts. Mis Ídolos, Hoy Mis Amigos!!! garnered Álvarez a nomination for Best Banda Album at the 17th Annual Latin Grammy Awards in 2016. Mis Ídolos, Hoy Mis Amigos!!! was nominated for Favorite Regional Mexican Album at the Latin American Music Awards of 2016, but lost to Banda MS' album, Qué Bendición.

Track listing

Charts

Weekly charts

Year-end charts

See also 
2016 in Latin music
List of number-one Billboard Latin Albums from the 2010s

References 

2016 albums
Julión Álvarez y su Norteño Banda albums
Fonovisa Records albums
Spanish-language albums